Hibernia is the Classical Latin name for the island of Ireland.

Hibernia may also refer to:

Locations

Australia

 Hibernia, Queensland, a locality in the Central Highlands, Queensland

Canada

 Hibernia, Nova Scotia, a community in the Region of Queens Municipality
 Hibernia oil field, a major offshore oil project on the Grand Banks of Newfoundland, Canada

United States
 Hibernia, Florida, a town
 Hibernia, Clark County, Indiana, an unincorporated place
 Hibernia, Montgomery County, Indiana, an unincorporated place
 Hibernia, New Jersey, an unincorporated place
 Hibernia mines, iron mines in northern New Jersey
 Hibernia, Ohio, a former village outside modern-day Reynoldsburg

Companies
 Hibernia Brewing, a defunct brewery in Eau Claire, Wisconsin.
 Hibernia Networks, a defunct telecom infrastructure provider, acquired by GTT Communications in 2017
 Hibernia National Bank, a defunct bank formerly operating in Louisiana and Texas, acquired by Capital One in 2005
 Hibernia Bank Building (New Orleans), former headquarters of Hibernia National Bank
 Hibernia Bank Building (San Francisco), former bank headquarters, now The Hibernia meeting and event space
 Hibernia College, an online college based in Ireland
 Hibernia REIT, a real estate investment trust based in Dublin

Transportation
 Hibernia (locomotive), the name given to one of the first two railway locomotives to run in Ireland
 Hibernia 41-E, steam locomotives run in Germany
 Hibernia (ship), several merchant vessels
 HMS Hibernia, ships of the British Royal Navy

Other uses
 Hibernia (personification), used occasionally as a national personification of Ireland
 Hibernia Atlantic, a transatlantic submarine communications cable connecting Canada and the United States with Ireland and the United Kingdom
 Hibernia, defunct Irish political magazine that was a predecessor publication of The Phoenix
 Hibernia, misspelling of Hybernia, a junior synonym of the geometer moth genus Erannis
 Hibernia (Máiréad Nesbitt album), a 2016 album by Irish violinist Máiréad Nesbitt

See also
 Hibernian (disambiguation)
 Hiberna, an obligation to accommodate troops during winter in the Polish–Lithuanian Commonwealth
 Hibernophile, someone very interested in Irish culture